Scottish DJ Calvin Harris has released six studio albums, one mix album, nine extended plays, 52 singles (including three as a featured artist), 12 promotional singles and 45 music videos. As of November 2014, Harris had sold 8,176,180 singles and tracks in the United Kingdom.

Harris's debut studio album, I Created Disco, was released in June 2007. The album peaked at number eight on the UK Albums Chart and was certified gold by the British Phonographic Industry (BPI). Its first two singles, "Acceptable in the 80s" and "The Girls", peaked at numbers 10 and three, respectively, on the UK Singles Chart, while the third single, "Merrymaking at My Place", reached number 43.

In August 2009, Harris released his second studio album, Ready for the Weekend, which debuted at number one on the UK Albums Chart and earned a gold certification from the BPI within two months of release. Its lead single, "I'm Not Alone", became Harris's first number one on the UK Singles Chart as a lead artist. "Ready for the Weekend" was released as the album's second single, peaking at number three in the United Kingdom. Two more singles were released from the album, "Flashback" and "You Used to Hold Me", which reached numbers 18 and 27 on the UK chart, respectively.

His third studio album, 18 Months, was released in October 2012. The album sees Harris stepping away from vocals, instead focusing on the music production. It earned Harris his second consecutive number-one album in his home country. 18 Months also became his first album to chart on the Billboard 200 in the United States, peaking at number 19, while reaching number two in Ireland, number five in Australia and number eight in Canada. The album's lead single, "Bounce" featuring Kelis, peaked at number two on the UK Singles Chart and gave Harris his first top-10 entry in Australia, peaking at number seven. The second single, "Feel So Close", also peaked at number two in the UK. The song brought Harris to international prominence, reaching number five in New Zealand and number seven in Australia, as well as becoming his first chart entry as a lead performer on the US Billboard Hot 100, where it charted at number 12.

In 2011, Harris wrote, produced and was featured on Rihanna's single "We Found Love", which topped the charts in 25 countries, including the United Kingdom, the United States, Ireland and Canada. The third and fourth singles from 18 Months, "Let's Go" (featuring Ne-Yo) and "We'll Be Coming Back" (featuring Example), both reached number two on the UK chart, with the former also peaking at number 17 on the Billboard Hot 100. The album's fifth single, "Sweet Nothing" featuring Florence Welch, became Harris's fourth number-one single in the UK and first top-10 single in the US. "Drinking from the Bottle" (featuring Tinie Tempah) and "I Need Your Love" (featuring Ellie Goulding) served as the album's sixth and seventh singles. Having both charted inside the UK top 10 by April 2013, Harris made chart history by becoming the first artist to attain eight top-10 singles from one studio album, overtaking the record previously set by Michael Jackson. The eighth and final single, "Thinking About You" featuring Ayah Marar, peaked at number eight on the UK Singles Chart.

Harris's fourth studio album, Motion, was released in October 2014. It peaked at number two on the UK Albums Chart and number five on the US Billboard 200, his highest-peaking album on the latter chart. The album includes the UK number-one singles "Under Control", "Summer" and "Blame", as well as the top-10 single "Outside".

In July 2015, Harris released the Disciples-assisted single "How Deep Is Your Love". Throughout 2016, he released a string of singles—"This Is What You Came For", "Hype" and "My Way", all becoming commercially successful. Harris released his fifth studio album, Funk Wav Bounces Vol. 1, in June 2017. The album was preceded by the singles "Slide", "Heatstroke", "Rollin" and "Feels".

Albums

Studio albums

Mix albums
 L.E.D. Festival Presents Calvin Harris (2010)

Extended plays
 Napster Live Session (2007)
 iTunes Live: Berlin Festival (2008)
 iTunes Live: London Festival '09 (2009)
 Normani x Calvin Harris (2018, with Normani)
 I'm Not Alone 2019 (2019)
 Love Regenerator 1 (2020, as Love Regenerator)
 Love Regenerator 2 (2020, as Love Regenerator)
 Love Regenerator 3 (2020, as Love Regenerator)
 Moving (2020, as Love Regenerator, with Eli Brown)
 Rollercoaster (2021, as Love Regenerator, with Solardo)

Singles

As lead artist

As featured artist

Promotional singles

Other charted songs

Guest appearances

Production and songwriting credits

Remixes

Charted remixes

Uncharted remixes

Music videos

Notes

References

External links
 
 
 
 

Discography
Discographies of British artists
Electronic music discographies